Parvathy Meera is an Indian lyricist working on Tamil language films. She has donned various roles in the media before stepping into the film industry and earned rightfully the tag 'multi-faceted'. She was an avant garde theatre artiste working mainly with journalist-political commentator Gnani's theatre group Pareeksha. Her last performance as a theatre artiste was in SLATE's production Anniyan, an adaptation of Albert Camus' immortal novel 'L'Étranger.' She stopped doing theatre ever since but she did few short films including one for TANSACS and a feature film for Dhan Foundation, Madurai in which she shared screen space with Chinnapillai Ammal. She played the protagonist in all of them.

Parvathy Meera was also an anchor for Podhigai TV for more than 5 years for the programmes Ennai Kavarndhavargal and Nam Virundhinar. During this time, she interviewed personalities from various strata of life, including writer Ponneelan, former Vice Chancellor of Madras University Shri. Thiruvasagam and the family members of Kothamangalam Subbu, earning a good name for her interviewing skills, spontaneity, vocabulary and diction, particularly from the aforesaid. She is equally good at spoken and written English and Tamil and this helped in chiselling her interviewing skills further. Parvathy Meera's three songs were nominated for best upcoming lyricist at the 2014 Mirchi Music Awards.

Academics
 
Parvathy Meera finished her higher secondary of schooling from Adarsh Vidyalaya, Chennai. Later she pursued B.A and M.A English Literature in The Ethiraj College For Women. Due to her interest in the media, she also did an MPhil in Mass Communication from Mother Teresa University's distance education programme.

Poetry

She has released three anthologies of Tamil poetry namely 'Ippadikku Naanum Natpum', 'Idhu Vaeru Mazhai' and 'Andha Moonru Naatkal' (on menstruation). After her second book of poetry, she decided to enter the film industry and is now a lyricist for Tamil films. Though she knows a smattering of Hindi and Telugu, she has written only for Tamil films thus far.

Films

Parvathy Meera made her debut in films with the Vijay starrer Jilla (2014). Though she was signed to write for Vallinam  first, Jilla turned out to be her first release. She followed up the superhit song in Jilla with Thirumanam enum Nikkah and a host of other films. After lyricist Thamarai, she was the next female lyricist to have written for a top hero. This happened in her very first film and this is considered to be significant in an industry which is known to be male dominated.

The poet lyricist, whose screen name appeared as Parvathy in her earlier films, announced on her social media pages in October 2022  that she would henceforth be credited as Parvathy Meera. She also mentioned that she added her mother's name Meera as her surname in order to honour her.

As a lyricist

References

 https://www.thenewsminute.com/article/how-women-lyricists-tamil-cinema-have-shattered-male-gaze-film-music-160371
 https://twitter.com/Parvathy_Meera/status/1577511468677074944?t=-wwkM2JjE65E1dYWDMScfA&s=19

External links
Parvathy Meera on Twitter
interview

Tamil film poets
Indian women poets
Tamil-language lyricists
Living people
1982 births
21st-century Indian poets
Writers from Chennai
Poets from Tamil Nadu
21st-century Indian women writers